Luxemburg-Casco High School (known informally as L-C) is a public high school located in Luxemburg, Wisconsin. It serves the greater Luxemburg-Casco area, and was founded in 1968 as a result of a merger between the school districts of Luxemburg and Casco.

Athletics 
L-C's athletic teams are known as the Spartans, and compete in the North Eastern Conference. The Spartans have won twenty-three WIAA state championships, tied with Wisconsin Rapids' Lincoln High School for eighteenth most in WIAA history.

Enrollment 
From 2000 to 2019, high school enrollment declined 13.8%.

Enrollment at Luxemburg–Casco High School, 2000–2019

Protest 
In  1964, the Lake to Lake dairy coop held its annual meeting at Luxemburg High School. Protestors from the National Farmers Organization dumped milk from a milk truck on the school grounds.

Notable alumni
Terry Jorgensen (class of 1984), professional baseball player
Tim Jorgensen, member of the College Baseball Hall of Fame
Brad Voyles (class of 1995), professional baseball player

References 

Public high schools in Wisconsin
Schools in Kewaunee County, Wisconsin